Andreas Becker (born 8 March 1970 in Mülheim an der Ruhr) is a German former field hockey player who competed in the 1992 Summer Olympics and in the 1996 Summer Olympics.

References

External links
 

1970 births
Living people
German male field hockey players
Olympic field hockey players of Germany
Field hockey players at the 1992 Summer Olympics
Field hockey players at the 1996 Summer Olympics
Olympic gold medalists for Germany
Olympic medalists in field hockey
Medalists at the 1992 Summer Olympics
20th-century German people
Fellows of the American Physical Society